Dolnja Briga (in older sources also Dolenja Briga) is a settlement in the Municipality of Kočevje in southern Slovenia. The area is part of the traditional region of Lower Carniola and is now included in the Southeast Slovenia Statistical Region.

The local church was dedicated to Saint Valentine, but only minor ruins remain of the building, which was removed in 1954. Near the center of the village are the ruins of a school, which was used as a base by Slovene partisans until 1944.

References

External links
Dolnja Briga on Geopedia
Pre–World War II map of Dolnja Briga with oeconyms and family names

Populated places in the Municipality of Kočevje